Snipp, Snapp, Snurr is the name of fictional triplets depicted in a series of children's books by author/illustrator Maj Lindman (1886-1972).
The triplets, all boys with blond hair, live in Sweden and have light-hearted misadventures. The series of books was created in the 1920s in Sweden and then printed in English in the United States from the 1930s. Lindman also started a series of books featuring three sisters, Flicka, Ricka, Dicka, with similar themes.  A 1936 New York Times review of the book Snipp Snapp Snurr and the Yellow Sled cited the Snipp, Snapp, Snurr series as "popular with the little children".

The series of books continued until approximately 1960. Some of Lindman's stories were included in a series of compilations called The Best of Children's Books.

Books (incomplete) 
Snipp Snapp Snurr and the Red Shoes
Snipp Snapp Snurr and the Big Surprise
Snipp Snapp Snurr and the Reindeer
Snipp Snapp Snurr Learn to Swim
Snipp Snapp Snurr and the Buttered Bread
Snipp Snapp Snurr and the Gingerbread
Snipp Snapp Snurr and the Yellow Sled
Snipp Snapp Snurr and the Seven Dogs
Snipp Snapp Snurr and the Big Farm
Snipp Snapp Snurr and the Magic Horse

See also
 Moomin

References

External links

 

Picture books
Swedish children's literature
Fictional triplets
Works about brothers
Male characters in literature
Sweden in fiction